The OSCE Representative on Freedom of the Media functions as a watchdog on media developments in all 57 participating member states of the Organization for Security and Co-operation in Europe (OSCE). The representative provides early warning on violations of freedom of expression and promotes full compliance with OSCE principles and commitments regarding freedom of expression and press freedom.

Mission 
In cases where serious violations have occurred, the representative seeks direct contacts with the offending state and other parties involved, assesses the facts and assists in resolving problems. The representative collects and receives information on the situation of the media from a variety of sources, including participating OSCE States, non-governmental organizations and media organizations. The representative meets with member governments.

The office of the representative is based in Vienna, Austria, and has a staff of 15.

Each year, they issue a joint declaration calling attention to worldwide free expression concerns.

Other bodies 
The OSCE Representative is one of the four international mechanisms for promoting freedom of expression. The others are:
 UN Special Rapporteur on Freedom of Opinion and Expression
 OAS Special Rapporteur for Freedom of Expression 
 African Commission on Human and Peoples' Rights Special Rapporteur for Freedom of Expression

Past and present representatives
 Freimut Duve (Germany): 1998–2004
 Miklós Haraszti (Hungary): 2004–2010
 Dunja Mijatović (Bosnia and Herzegovina): 2010–2017
 Harlem Désir (France): 2017-2020
 Teresa Ribeiro (Portugal): since 2020

References

External links

 Official website of the Representative on Freedom of the Media
 Mandate of OSCE Representative on Freedom of the Media
 Follow the OSCE Representative on Freedom of the Media on Facebook
 Follow the OSCE Representative on Freedom of the Media on Twitter

Intergovernmental human rights organizations
Freedom of expression
Diplomacy
Organization for Security and Co-operation in Europe
Journalism organizations in Europe